"Advice" is a song by English rapper Cadet and English singer Deno, released on 28 August 2018. The song peaked at number 14 on the UK Singles Chart in February 2019 following Cadet's death; it had previously reached number one on the UK Independent Singles Breakers Chart in September 2018. The song has since amassed over 30 million views on YouTube. The song mentions English footballer Dele Alli where the two rappers are seen depicting the Dele Alli signature celebration in the album art. The song was included on Cadet's posthumous debut album The Rated Legend, released on 10 April 2020.

Charts

Weekly charts

Year-end charts

References

2018 singles
2018 songs
Cadet (rapper) songs
Deno (singer) songs